Sokoliki Górskie  (Sokolyky Hirs’ki) is a former village in the administrative district of Gmina Lutowiska, within Bieszczady County, Subcarpathian Voivodeship, in south-eastern Poland, close to the border with Ukraine.

The part of the village on the Ukrainian side of the border is still populated.

References

Villages in Bieszczady County